Inza is a town and the administrative center of Inzensky District in Ulyanovsk Oblast, Russia, located on the Syuksyumka River (Sura's basin)  southwest of Ulyanovsk, the administrative center of the oblast. Population:

History

It was founded in 1897 as a settlement around a railway station. Urban-type settlement status was granted to it in 1938; town status was granted in 1946.

Administrative and municipal status
Within the framework of administrative divisions, Inza serves as the administrative center of Inzensky District. As an administrative division, it is, together with two rural localities, incorporated within Inzensky District as the town of district significance of Inza. As a municipal division, the town of district significance of Inza is incorporated within Inzensky Municipal District as Inzenskoye Urban Settlement.

References

Notes

Sources

External links

Official website of Inza 
Inza Business Directory 

Cities and towns in Ulyanovsk Oblast